Prarthana TV  is a 24-hour Odia language spiritual TV channel. It was founded on 14 April 2010. It covers religious programs, religious discussions and devotional songs.

See also
List of Odia-language television channels
List of longest-running Indian television series

References

Odisha Television Network
Odia-language television channels
Religious television channels in India
Companies based in Bhubaneswar
Television stations in Bhubaneswar
2010 establishments in Orissa
Television channels and stations established in 2010